Carlo Alberto de Gavardo Prohens (14 July 1969 – 4 July 2015) was a Chilean motorist and motorcyclist who participated in numerous rallies worldwide, including the Dakar Rally and Rallye des Pharaons. He was the first Chilean motorcyclist to run the Paris-Dakar from beginning to end.

Biography

Beginning as a Pilot 
Carlo de Gavardo received his elementary and high school education from the Craighouse School and Marshall School in Santiago. While he was studying in this last establishment he began his active participation in Chilean motorcycling, where he won the Enduro National Championship consecutively for almost a decade between 1986 and 1994. In 1993 he begins to expand his horizons and compete at an international level in the Enduro World Championship in Tulsa, Oklahoma, this only increased his passion for the sport and fed his ambition. In 1996 he prepares to run the Paris – Dakar Rallye and becomes the first Chilean to finish the rally. On this occasion he is rewarded with a highly regarded seventeenth place. Carlo de Gavardo has participated in every Dakar since 1996 up until 2004, achieving his best result (a third place) in 2001.

Championships and achievements

By 1997, he receives a fourth place in the Master Rallye: Paris – Moscow – Beijing and is recognized worldwide for the amazing skill shown while driving his motorcycle. In 2001, 2004, and 2005 he wins the Rallye World Cup of the International Motorcycling Federation. In 2004 and 2005 he became the World Motorcycling Champion in the 450 cc category.

Carlo de Gavardo has participated in the Atlas Rally, Two Sertoes, Master Rallye, Pharaohs Rally in Egypt, Dubai Rally, Las Pampas Rally in Argentina, Morocco Rally, and the Safari Rally.

Fair play
Carlo de Gavardo received two fair-play awards twice, one by the IOC and another by the International Motorcycling Federation.

Some of his non-sporting activities included an alliance with the Chilean Police force with the objective of reducing the number of traffic accidents involving motorcycles. The coalition stretches from Arica to Punta Arenas with the sole purpose of creating responsible drivers through courses that help teach many motorcycle owners what they need to know about safety and being precautious.

The Transition from 2 wheels to 4
There is a growing tendency among motorcyclists, including Stéphane Peterhansel y Nani Roma, when they reach a point in their careers in which they exchange their motorcycles for a larger vehicle. Carlo announced his retirement from motorcycles as to continue competing as a motorist. He began to compete in this category during 2008, and in 2009 participated in the Dakar with Hummer. This transition was a personal and professional choice for this well-known Chilean idol.

Death
De Gavardo died of a cardiac arrest while riding his bike in Huelquen (near Buin) on July 4, 2015.

References

1969 births
2015 deaths
Chilean motorcycle racers
Chilean people of Italian descent